Romberg is a German surname which may refer to:

 Andreas Romberg (1767–1821), German composer, violinist
 Bernhard Romberg (1767–1841), German cellist and composer
 Brett Romberg (born 1979), American football player
 Luci Romberg, an American stuntwoman
 Moritz Heinrich Romberg (1795–1873), German physician (also see Romberg's test)
 Sigmund Romberg (1887–1951), Hungarian-born American composer
 Walter Romberg (1928–2014), German politician

See also
 Romberg's method, a mathematical procedure for numerical integration
 Romberg's test, a medical test in neurology

German-language surnames